Union Sportive Municipale de Malakoff is a multi-sport club located in Malakoff, France. Founded in 1945 as a result of a merger between Malakoff Sportif and Acacias Sportifs de Malakoff, the club is best known for its football and handball sections.

References

External links 

 Club website
Sports clubs established in 1945
1945 establishments in France
Malakoff
Malakoff